

B
Sam Babcock,
Don Batchelor,
Arda Bowser,
Ray Brenner,
Howard "Cub" Buck,
Bob Butler,
Sol Butler

C
Pete Calac,
Bird Carroll,
Guy Chamberlin,
John Comer,
Rudy Comstock,
Larry Conover,
Art Corcoran,
Frank Culver,

D
Harrie Dadmun,
Bill Dagenhard,
Henry Dagenhard,
Art Deibel,
Francis Dunn,

E
Cap Edwards,
Doc Elliott

F
Guil Falcon,
Al Feeney,
Willie Flattery,
Wilmer Fleming

G
Bill Gardner,
Bill Garlow,
Milt Ghee,
Johnny Gilroy,
Tom Gormley,
Larry Green,
Percy W. Griffiths,
Cecil Grigg,
Albert Guarnieri,
Joe Guyon

H
Doc Haggerty,
Don Hamilton,
Russ Hathaway,
Harry Hazlett,
Johnny Hendren,
Dutch Hendrian,
Pete Henry,
Bob Higgins,
Paul Hogan

J
Ben Jones,
Carp Julian
Art Jackson

K
John Kellison,
Herb Kempton,
Jim Kendrick,
Glenn Killinger,
Rip Kyle

L
Jim Laird,
Joe Little Twig,
Bull Lowe,
William R. Lyman

M
Al Maginnes,
Cliff Marker,
Ike Martin,
Ray McGregor,
Johnny McQuade,
Wade McRoberts,
Ralph Meadow,
Lou Merillat,
Candy Miller,
Jim Morrow,
Vern Mullen,
William Murrah

N
Greasy Neale,
John Nichols

O
Roscoe Oberlin,
Dan O'Connor,
Duke Osborn,
Steve Owen

R
Ruel Redinger,
Harry Robb,
Stan Robb,
Guy Roberts,
Wooky Roberts,
Ben Roderick,
George Roudebush

S
Jack Sack,
Norb Sacksteder,
Eddie Sauer,
Dick Schuster,
Frank Seeds,
Fred Sefton,
Ben Shaw,
Ed Shaw,
Fritz Slackford,
Smoke Smalley,
Charlie Smith,
Marv Smith,
Lou Smyth,
Russ Smith,
Ernie Soucy,
Doc Spears,
Dutch Speck,
Red Steele,
Russ Stein,
Pat Steiner,
Paul Steinberg,
Dutch Strasser

T
Tarzan Taylor,
Duckey Terrett,
Jim Thorpe,
Harry Turner

V
Dick Van Alman,
Eddie Van Alman,
Norm Van Alman,
Dick Vick

W
Hube Wagner,
Ralph Waldsmith,
Blondy Wallace,
Dutch Wallace,
Charley Way,
Gus Welch,
Belford West,
Tom Whelan,
Sam Willaman,
Ink Williams,
Joe Williams

Y
Swede Youngstrom

Z
Harold Zerbe,
Giff Zimmerman

References

External links

 
Can